The Saline is a river in the province of Pescara in the Abruzzo region of Italy The river is formed by the confluence of the Fino and Tavo rivers. It flows northeast and enters the Adriatic Sea near Montesilvano and Città Sant'Angelo.

References

Rivers of the Province of Pescara
Rivers of Italy
Adriatic Italian coast basins